Diwan Bahadur Pattu Kesava Pillai (8 October 1860 – 28 March 1933) was an Indian journalist, politician and activist of the Indian Independence movement.

Early life 

Pattu Kesava Pillai was born in a Vellalar family of Pattu in North Arcot district on 8 October 1860.  He studied in Madras and began his career as a journalist for The Hindu. In 1883, at the age of 22, Kesava Pillai was appointed The Hindu's correspondent for Gooty. From then on, Kesava Pillai became known as "Gooty Kesava Pillai".

Public life 

Kesava Pillai was elected to Gooty municipality and served as a member of the municipality. He was also eventually elected to the Madras Legislative Council as representing Municipalities.

Politics 

Kesava Pillai was interested in politics from an early stage in his life. He participated in the first session of the Indian National Congress held at Bombay on 28 December 1885 representing the town of Gooty. At a later stage, he adopted more reactionary methods and was jailed from time to time. He was staunchly opposed to the Justice Party and the Dravidian Movement.

Madras Legislative Council 

Kesava Pillai served in the Madras Legislative Council for quite a long time and is credited with having proposed a number of reforms. He was the principal architect of the Jail Commission  and moved the Jail policy resolution which was passed by the government of the Raja of Panagal. He was also responsible for the creation of the Madras Forest Commission. Kesava Pillai was eventually elected Vice-President of the Madras Legislative Council and served in his capacity for some time.

References

Biographies 

 

1860 births
1933 deaths
19th-century Indian journalists
20th-century Indian journalists
The Hindu journalists
Indian National Congress politicians from Tamil Nadu
20th-century Indian politicians
19th-century Indian politicians
Writers from Chennai
Journalists from Tamil Nadu